Our Lady of Peñafrancia Shrine is a Roman Catholic church in the Philippines, located in Naga City. It is under the jurisdiction of the Archdiocese of Caceres. The church was formerly the home of the image of Our Lady of Peñafrancia, before the Peñafrancia Basilica was constructed. Our Lady of Peñafrancia is one of East Asia's greatest sites of Christian pilgrimage.

The parish church is also the location of the Plaza Miguel Robles de Covarrubias, where the Traslacion procession of Our Lady of Peñafrancia begins, opening the Peñafrancia Festival.

Gallery

References

External links

 Official Site of the Archdiocese of Caceres

Buildings and structures in Naga, Camarines Sur
Roman Catholic churches in Camarines Sur
Churches in the Roman Catholic Archdiocese of Caceres